Agyrta pandemia is a moth of the subfamily Arctiinae. It was described by Herbert Druce in 1893. It is found in Pará, Brazil.

References

Moths described in 1893
Arctiinae
Moths of South America